PDMA may refer to:

 Perth Dance Music Awards, a yearly Australian music event.
 Polarisation division multiple access, a cellular network component.
 Power-division multiple access, a transmission power-sharing scheme
 Prescription Drug Marketing Act, an American federal law.
 Product Development and Management Association, a professional group for new product development